Amiantos is a village in the Limassol District of Cyprus, located 9 km south-west of Kyperounta.

Pano Amiantos

Pano Amiantos is a village in the Limassol District of Cyprus, located 7 km southwest of Kyperounta. Formerly the village was the site of a large asbestos mine.

When the mine closed the enormous workings were left as a blot on the landscape of the Troodos. There is now a project under way for the replanting of the workings which should eventually restore the landscape to its former beauty, if not its former shape.

References

Communities in Limassol District